The 1967 William & Mary Indians football team was an American football team that represented the College of William & Mary as a member of the Southern Conference (SoCon) during the 1967 NCAA University Division football season. In their fourth season under head coach Marv Levy, William & Mary compiled a 5–4–1 record, with a mark of 2–2–1 in conference play, placing fourth in the SoCon.

Schedule

NFL Draft selections

References

William and Mary
William & Mary Tribe football seasons
William